Gelson Dany Batalha Martins (born 11 May 1995) is a Portuguese professional footballer who plays as a winger for Ligue 1 club Monaco.

He began his career at Sporting CP, appearing in 125 competitive matches and winning two trophies during his three-year tenure. In 2018, he signed with Atlético Madrid and, the following year, joined Monaco, initially on loan.

A Portuguese international since 2016, Martins represented the nation at the 2018 World Cup and the 2017 Confederations Cup.

Club career

Sporting CP
Born in Praia, Cape Verde, Martins moved to Portugal in his teens and played youth football with C.F. Benfica and Sporting CP. In March 2014, he was promoted to the B team of the latter and signed a contract lasting until 2019 and which included a release clause of €45 million. During his youth spell, his goal against C.F. União de Coimbra earned the praise of many, even though his coach at Sporting B had previously said that he was being "harmed" by not playing in his preferred position as winger.

Martins made his professional debut on 24 August 2014, coming on as a late substitute for Lewis Enoh in a 1–0 away win against S.C. Olhanense in the Segunda Liga. On 21 December, he scored his first goal in the competition, contributing to a 3–1 victory at Vitória S.C. B.

In summer 2015, Martins was promoted to the main squad by new manager Jorge Jesus. He made his competitive debut on 9 August, playing injury time in a 1–0 win over S.L. Benfica in the Supertaça Cândido de Oliveira.

Martins first appeared in the Primeira Liga on 14 August 2015, playing one minute in a 2–1 defeat of newly promoted C.D. Tondela. On 15 January of the following year, against the same opponent, he scored Sporting's 5,000th goal in the competition, putting the hosts ahead in an eventual 2–2 draw.

On 11 June 2018, Martins requested that his contract with Sporting be terminated following an incident in May in which a group of around 50 supporters invaded the club's training centre and assaulted several players and staff members.

Atlético Madrid
On 18 July 2018, Martins accepted an offer from Atlético Madrid. One week later, he was announced as a new player of the Spanish club after agreeing to a five-year deal on a free transfer. Sporting made an official complaint to FIFA over the transfer and demanded compensation of €100 million, the release clause of his cancelled contract.

Martins made his La Liga debut on 20 August 2018 in a 1–1 away draw with Valencia CF, where he played 18 minutes in place of Antoine Griezmann. Two months later, in a 1–0 victory against amateurs UE Sant Andreu in the round of 32 of the Copa del Rey, he scored his first goal.

During his spell at the Metropolitano Stadium, Martins was sparingly played by coach Diego Simeone.

Monaco
On 27 January 2019, Martins joined AS Monaco FC on loan until the end of the season. He made his first Ligue 1 appearance on 2 February, providing an assist for Aleksandr Golovin early in the first half and also being involved in Cesc Fàbregas' goal in the 2–1 home victory over Toulouse FC.

In July 2019, Martins joined Monaco outright after signing a five-year contract. The following 1 February, at the 30-minute mark of an away fixture against Nîmes Olympique, he repeatedly pushed referee Mikael Lesage in retaliation for his teammate Tiémoué Bakayoko's ejection seconds before, and was too sent off as his team eventually lost 3–1. For his actions, he was issued a six-month suspension on 5 March.

International career
Martins was in the Portugal squad for the 2014 UEFA European Under-19 Championship, playing all the matches en route to a runner-up finish in Hungary. He also represented the nation at the 2015 FIFA U-20 World Cup, scoring in the group stage against Senegal and in the round of 16 against hosts New Zealand in an eventual quarter-final exit.

In late September 2016, Martins got his first call up to the senior team, for 2018 FIFA World Cup qualifiers against Andorra and the Faroe Islands. He won his first cap against the former, replacing Pepe for the last 18 minutes of the 6–0 win in Aveiro.

Martins was picked by manager Fernando Santos for his 2018 FIFA World Cup squad. He made his debut in the competition on 20 June, playing roughly 30 minutes in the 1–0 group stage defeat of Morocco after replacing Bernardo Silva.

Style of play
Mainly a winger on both flanks, Martins can also operate as a right back, a trait which cemented his place in the junior national teams.

Personal life
Martins' cousin, Euclides Cabral, is also a footballer.

Career statistics

Club

International

Honours
Sporting CP
Taça da Liga: 2017–18
Supertaça Cândido de Oliveira: 2015

Atlético Madrid
UEFA Super Cup: 2018

Portugal
FIFA Confederations Cup third place: 2017

Individual
UEFA European Under-19 Championship Team of the Tournament: 2014
SJPF Primeira Liga Team of the Year: 2016, 2017
UEFA Europa League Squad of the Season: 2017–18

References

External links

Profile at the AS Monaco FC website

1995 births
Living people
Sportspeople from Praia
Portuguese sportspeople of Cape Verdean descent
Black Portuguese sportspeople
Cape Verdean footballers
Portuguese footballers
Footballers from Santiago, Cape Verde
Association football wingers
Primeira Liga players
Liga Portugal 2 players
Sporting CP B players
Sporting CP footballers
La Liga players
Atlético Madrid footballers
Ligue 1 players
AS Monaco FC players
Portugal youth international footballers
Portugal under-21 international footballers
Portugal international footballers
2017 FIFA Confederations Cup players
2018 FIFA World Cup players
Cape Verdean expatriate footballers
Portuguese expatriate footballers
Expatriate footballers in Portugal
Expatriate footballers in Spain
Expatriate footballers in Monaco
Cape Verdean expatriate sportspeople in Portugal
Portuguese expatriate sportspeople in Spain
Portuguese expatriate sportspeople in Monaco